The Bina–Katni line is the railway route between  of Bina and  of Katni in Madhya Pradesh, India.

History
The line was established in the year 1923 before India got independence, making it one of the oldest train routes in India. It was started with a single track which was later converted to double track in 1982. It got electrified in year 1991

Important trains passing through
The line serves important stations for both goods as well as passenger express and mail trains. The important trains include :

Bhopal–Rewa Rewanchal Express
Bhopal–Bilaspur Express
Bhopal–Itarsi Vindhyachal Express
Bhopal–Lucknow Express
Bhopal–Damoh Rajya Rani Express
Rewa–Dr. Ambedkar Nagar Express
Durg–Jammu Tawi Express
Howrah–Bhopal Weekly Express
Indore–Howrah Shipra Express
Bhopal–Singrauli Superfast Express
Bilaspur–Itwari Intercity Superfast Express
Somnath–Jabalpur Express (via Itarsi)
Jabalpur–Hazrat Nizamuddin MP Express
Jabalpur–Hazrat Nizamuddin Gondwana Express
Jabalpur–Jaipur Express
Jabalpur–Jammu Tawi Durgavati Express
Jaipur–Durg Express
Lokmanya Tilak Terminus (Mumbai)–Varanasi Kamayani Express
Puri–Haridwar Kalinga utkal Express
Amritsar–Vishakhapattanam Hirakund Express
Shalimar–Udaipur City Weekly Express
Ajmer–Kolkata Express
Bina–Katni 505 Passenger
Damoh–Kota Passenger
Bina–Damoh Passenger
Saugor–Katni Passenger
Saugor–Chirmiri Passenger

Trains waiting for approval 
As per demands and to reduce passenger traffic of the route, a few trains were demanded which though got the green signal (but these were not announced in the Rail Budget) from the parliament but just waiting for approval by the railway minister. These demanded trains include :

 Bhopal–Saugor Passenger by extending Bhopal–Bina Passenger to Saugor
 Nagpur–Rewa Superfast Express

Stations on this railway section
On the route, the following are the main railway stations :

Baghora

Sumreri
Jeruwakheda
Isarwara
Nariaoli
Ratona

Makronia
Lidhora Khurd
Girwar
Dangidhar
Ganeshganj
Patharia
Aslana

Karhiya Bhiadeli
Bandakpur
Ghatera
Golapatti
Sagaoni
Ratangaon
Salaia
Bakhleta
Rithi
Patohan
Hardua
Majhgawanphatak
Katni Murwara Junction
 (Madhya Pradesh)

References

External links
Official Website of West Central Railway

Rail transport in Madhya Pradesh
Railway lines opened in 1923
5 ft 6 in gauge railways in India
1923 establishments in India